The Swan Medal is awarded to the player judged to be the fairest and best in the Swan Districts Football Club league team. The medal has been presented continuously since 1934 with the exception of 1942.

References

Swan Districts Football Club
Australian rules football awards
1934 establishments in Australia
Awards established in 1934